Alexandra Jóhannsdóttir (born 19 March 2000) is an Icelandic professional footballer who plays as a midfielder for Italian Serie A club Fiorentina and the Iceland women's national team.

Early life
Jóhannsdóttir first started playing football in the Haukar academy at the age of six. In May 2019, she graduated from Flensborgarskóli in Hafnarfjörður. Aside from football, she also played handball and practised gymnastics frequently in her youth.

Career
Jóhannsdóttir has been capped for the Iceland national team. In her time at Breiðablik, she scored 44 goals in 88 games. It was announced, in January 2021, that she had signed for German club Eintracht Frankfurt.

International goals
Scores and results list the Iceland's goal tally first.

References

Johannsdottir, Alexandra
Johannsdottir, Alexandra
Johannsdottir, Alexandra
Icelandic women's footballers
Iceland women's international footballers
Breiðablik women's football players
Haukar women's football players
Johannsdottir, Alexandra
Úrvalsdeild kvenna (football) players
Johannsdottir, Alexandra
Icelandic expatriate footballers
Johannsdottir, Alexandra
Icelandic expatriate sportspeople in Germany
Serie A (women's football) players
Icelandic expatriate sportspeople in Italy
Fiorentina Women's F.C. players
Johannsdottir, Alexandra